Daniel Smith Thrap (18 September 1832  – 20 March 1913) was a Norwegian priest, historian and author.

biography
Daniel Thrap was born at Aker in Oslo, Norway. He was the son of Niels Andreas Thrap (1793-1856) and Maren Christine  Bonnevie  (1801-1838). He was a brother-in-law of civil servant Jochum Johansen.

Daniel Thrap graduated with his cand.theol. degree in 1856. He worked in Bergen at the Bergen Cathedral and as chaplain for the Bergen prison system from 1857 to 1876. He was pastor in Modum in Buskerud from 1876 to 1880. From 1880 to 1902, he was vicar at Sofienberg Church (Sofienberg Kirke) in Sofienbergparken within the district of Grünerløkka in Oslo.

 
Thrap wrote a number of biographies and published collections of sermon. He also wrote a number of articles for newspapers in both Bergen and Oslo. Additionally he edited the magazine Zuluvennen, a publication for Norwegian mission churches. His notable works include  Bidrag til den norske Kirkes Historie i det nittende Aarhundrede. which consisted of two volumes, released in 1884 and 1890.

Selected works
Hyrdebreve fra bergenske Biskoper (1875)
Bergenske Kirkeforhold i det 17de Aarhundrede (1879)
Thomas von Westen og Finne-missjonen (1882)
Bidrag til den norske Kirkes Historie i det nittende Aarhundrede (1884–1890)
Knud Spødervold og de stærk troende (1892)
Christiansands Stifts Prester i det syttende Aarhundrede (1899)
Familien Bonnevie i Norge og Danmark 1715-1900 (1900)
Wilhelm Andreas Wexels: Livs- og Tidsbillede (1905)
Brødremenigheden i Norge (1908)

References

Other Source
Knudtzon,  Nicolay  Heinrich (2012) Daniel Thraps erindringer om Handelsmænd i Bergen på 1800-tallet (Oslo: Novus Forlag)  .

External links

1832 births
1913 deaths
20th-century Norwegian Lutheran clergy
20th-century Norwegian historians
Norwegian magazine editors
Writers from Oslo
19th-century Norwegian Lutheran clergy
19th-century Norwegian historians